Willie George is the founding pastor of Church on the Move in Tulsa, Oklahoma.

Born and raised in Texas, George converted to Christianity while in high school. He and his wife, Deleva, have been married over 30 years. In addition to two sons and two daughters, they have ten grandchildren.

Willie George became a Christian in 1972 and began work in the Children's Ministry as a youth pastor of a church of 200 in Plainview, Texas. George believes that God spoke to him during a significant and intense time of prayer and instructed him to found a church in Tulsa. George and his wife Deleva moved to Tulsa and he accepted a position with Faith Christian Fellowship in a children's ministry position. He decided to resign from the church in 1980 and travel — he formed his own ministry later on in that year. Willie George is well known for his role as "Gospel Bill" in his evangelism TV shows. He also performed in the Gospel Bill role in one episode of The Wichita Slim Trilogy alongside Kenneth Copeland as Wichita Slim (a Sheriff). Willie George was also instrumental in producing Fire By Nite, a televised Christian program aimed at reaching a youthful audience. It aired on the Trinity Broadcasting Network and other local broadcast networks across America in the early to mid 1990s.

Willie George started Church on the Move on the outskirts of Tulsa in 1987 with 163 people in attendance. Church on the Move has a conservative church membership numbering well over 10,000+ as of 2009. It is a three-campus church and classified as being a Mega-church in the Tulsa area.

As of January 2010, Church on the Move was reported to be the largest church in Tulsa, with an average Sunday attendance of 9,000 to 11,000.

In 1996 George also started "The Christmas Train" at the Dry Gulch location. The train ride takes its riders through a biblical re-telling of the birth of Jesus Christ.

Filmography
 The Gunslinger 
 Covenant Rider 
 The Treasure of Eagle Mountain

See also
 List of people from Tulsa, Oklahoma

References 

Dad Life - A music video put together by Church on the Move in Tulsa, OK for Father's Day 2010.
http://vimeo.com/12714406

External links
Church on the Move website
 The Christmas Train (Located at the Drygulch, U.S.A. park)
The Gospel Bill Show
Willie George Ministries
Camp Dry Gulch, U.S.A.

Living people
American Christian clergy
Year of birth missing (living people)